Bloom Township is one of 29 townships in Cook County, Illinois, USA.  As of the 2020 census, its population was 89,226.

Geography

Cities, towns, villages
 Chicago Heights
 Flossmoor (east quarter)
 Ford Heights
 Glenwood (vast majority)
 Homewood (half)
 Lansing (south quarter)
 Lynwood
 Olympia Fields (small portion)
 Park Forest (small portion)
 Sauk Village (vast majority)
 South Chicago Heights
 Steger (north half)

Unincorporated Towns
Graymoor at 
Holbrook at

Adjacent townships
 Thornton Township (north)
 North Township, Lake County, Indiana (northeast)
 St. John Township, Lake County, Indiana (east)
 Crete Township, Will County (south)
 Monee Township, Will County (southwest)
 Rich Township (west)
 Bremen Township (northwest)

Cemeteries
The township contains these six cemeteries: Assumption, Bloom Presbyterian, Calvary, Mount Glenwood Memory Gardens, Saint James Catholic and Saint Pauls Evangelical Lutheran.

Major highways
  U.S. Route 30
  Illinois Route 1
  Illinois Route 394

Airports and landing strips
 Lansing Municipal Airport
 Mulderink Heliport
 Raeco Heliport

Lakes
 Sauk Lake

Landmarks
 Cook County Forest Preserves

Demographics

Political districts
 Illinois's 2nd congressional district
 State House District 29
 State House District 30
 State House District 80
 State Senate District 15
 State Senate District 40

References
 
 United States Census Bureau 2007 TIGER/Line Shapefiles
 United States National Atlas

External links
 Bloom Township official site
 City-Data.com
 Illinois State Archives
 Township Officials of Illinois
 Cook County official site

Townships in Cook County, Illinois
Townships in Illinois